Yerköy is a town and district of Yozgat Province in the Central Anatolia region of Turkey. According to 2000 census, population of the district is 48,889 of which 32,228 live in the town of Yerköy. The Mayor is Ferhat Yilmaz from the İyi Party (İYİ).

2009 Great Union Party's rally 

A rally of the Great Union Party (BBP) was scheduled at 17:00 EET (15:00 UTC) on March 25, 2009 in the town, at which party leader Muhsin Yazıcıoğlu was expected to hold a speech before the upcoming local elections. Yazıcıoğlu was underway from another rally in Çağlayancerit, Kahramanmaraş by a chartered helicopter. The helicopter crashed at Mount Keş in Göksun district of Kahramanmaraş Province, causing the death of the pilot and all five passengers. The crash site could be reached only two days later due to harsh weather conditions in the region.

Notes

References

External links
 District municipality's official website 
 A web portal of Yerköy 

Populated places in Yozgat Province
Districts of Yozgat Province